"No Effect" is a song by Australian hip-hop artist Hooligan Hefs, released independently on 21 May 2019 through Hooligan Hefs and The Area Movement.

"No Effect" was certified platinum in Australia in 2020.

A remix EP was released on 21 January 2020.

Music video
The music video was released on 21 May 2019.

Track listing

Certification

References

2019 singles
2019 songs
Hooligan Hefs songs
Songs written by Hooligan Hefs